Miguel de Beistegui (born April 3, 1966) is a continental philosopher and Professor of Philosophy at the University of Warwick.
He is known for his expertise on Heidegger's thought.

Books
 Heidegger and the Political, Routledge, 1998
 Philosophy and Tragedy (ed. with Simon Sparks), Routledge, 2000
 Thinking with Heidegger: Displacements, Indiana University Press, 2003
 Truth and Genesis: Philosophy as Differential Ontology, Indiana University Press, 2004
 The New Heidegger, Continuum, 2005
 Proust as Philosopher: The Art of Metaphor, Routledge, 2012
 Immanence and Philosophy: Deleuze, Edinburgh University Press, 2010
 Éloge de Chillida/In Praise of Chillida, Gourcuff/Gradenigo, 2011
 Aesthetics After Metaphysics: From Mimesis to Metaphor, Routledge, 2012
 The Care of Life: Transdisciplinary Perspectives in Bioethics and Biopolitics (ed. with G. Bianco and M. Gracieuse), Rowman and Littlefield, 2014
 The Government of Desire: A Genealogy of the Liberal Subject, Chicago University Press, 2018
 Lacan: A Genealogy, Bloomsbury, 2021
 L'élan du désir : Pour une éthique de la volupté, Seuil, 2021
 Thought Under Threat: On Superstition, Spite, and Stupidity, Chicago University Press, 2022

References

External links
Miguel de Beistegui at the University of Warwick

21st-century British philosophers
Phenomenologists
Continental philosophers
Philosophy academics
Heidegger scholars
Living people
1966 births
Academics of the University of Warwick
Loyola University Chicago alumni
Paris-Sorbonne University alumni